The 27th Utah Senate District is located in Carbon, Emery, Grand, San Juan and Utah Counties and includes Utah House Districts 55, 65, 66, 67, 69 and 70. The current State Senator representing the 27th district is Mike Dmitrich. Dmitrich was appointed to the Utah Senate in 1992 and was subsequently elected to the Utah Senate in 1992 and is up for re-election in 2008.

Previous Utah State Senators (District 27)

Election results

2004 General Election

See also

 Mike Dmitrich
 Utah Democratic Party
 Utah Republican Party
 Utah Senate

External links
 Utah Senate District Profiles
 Official Biography of Mike Dmitrich

27
Carbon County, Utah
Emery County, Utah
Grand County, Utah
San Juan County, Utah
Utah County, Utah